George Bennett Gibson (29 September 1903 – 1977) was a Scottish footballer who played as an inside forward.

He began his senior career in Scotland with Dundee, but failed to claim a regular place and was loaned out to St Johnstone. After two seasons on Tayside, he joined hometown club Hamilton Academical (where his father Alex had once been club chairman) and became established as a highly talented player.

Gibson moved to English football with Bolton Wanderers in March 1927. Two years later, he was in the Trotters team which won the FA Cup, scoring in the semi-final win over Huddersfield Town at Anfield before playing his part in beating Portsmouth in the final at Wembley. With six years and 236 Football League First Division appearances for Bolton behind him, a strong performance and goal against Chelsea in February 1933 prompted the London club to sign him a few weeks later, and he spent the last five seasons of his professional career at Stamford Bridge before retiring.

References

1903 births
1977 deaths
Scottish footballers
Footballers from Hamilton, South Lanarkshire
Kirkintilloch Rob Roy F.C. players
St Johnstone F.C. players
Dundee F.C. players
Bolton Wanderers F.C. players
Hamilton Academical F.C. players
Chelsea F.C. players
Association football inside forwards
English Football League players
Scottish Junior Football Association players
Scottish Football League players
FA Cup Final players